The 2016 World Mountain Running Championships was the 32nd edition of the global mountain running competition, World Mountain Running Championships, organised by the World Mountain Running Association and was held in Sapareva Banya, Bulgaria on 11 September 2016.

Results

Men individual

Men team

Women individual

Women team

References

External links
 World Mountain Running Association official web site

World Mountain Running Championships
World Long Distance Mountain Running